{{DISPLAYTITLE:C8H9NO3}}
The molecular formula C8H9NO3 (molar mass: 167.16 g/mol) may refer to:

 Glycin, a photographic developing agent
 4-Hydroxyphenylglycine, an amino acid
 Orthocaine, an anesthetic
 Pyridoxal, one of the three natural forms of vitamin B6